The Ramparts are rapids in a  canyon that forms a navigational impediment on Canada's Mackenzie River, in the Northwest Territories.

According to the 1968 Great Slave Lake and Mackenzie River Pilot, the rapids lie between mile 672 and 682.

Early explorers for the North West Company reported that Stone Age "eskimo" were known to have ascended the river as far as The Ramparts, in search of flint, to make stone tools.

A scholarly study on climate change discussed how it had led to reduced water levels, which were, in turn affecting navigation.  Water levels in the shipping channel in The Ramparts sometimes falls below —too shallow for the tugboats used for water transport on the river.

References

Rapids of Canada
Mackenzie River